Tiekiedraai is a village in Sekhukhune District Municipality in the Limpopo province of South Africa.

References

Populated places in the Fetakgomo Tubatse Local Municipality